Sika is a rural locality (a selo) in Kurkaksky Selsoviet, Tabasaransky District, Republic of Dagestan, Russia. The population was 113 as of 2010.

Geography 
Sika is located 11 km southeast of Khuchni (the district's administrative centre) by road.

References 

Rural localities in Tabasaransky District